Jean Yonnel (21 July 1891 – 17 August 1968) was a Romanian-born French actor.

Yonnel was born in Bucharest, Romania as Jean-Estève Schachmann and began his film career in France in the 1910s. Some of his notable performance were in Obsession (1933), Amok (1934), Fanatisme (1934), White Nights of St. Petersburg (1937), The Imperial Tragedy (1939) and A Funny Parishioner (1963). Yonnel died in Paris in 1968.

Filmography

References

External links

1891 births
1968 deaths
Male actors from Bucharest
Sociétaires of the Comédie-Française
French male stage actors
French male film actors
French male silent film actors
20th-century French male actors
Romanian emigrants to France